Roger R. Moore (August 4, 1922 – September 21, 2020) was an American politician in the state of South Dakota. He has been a member of the South Dakota House of Representatives. With a high school education, Moore has been a farmer, partsman, and insurance agent.

References

1922 births
2020 deaths
Democratic Party members of the South Dakota House of Representatives
United States Army personnel of World War II
People from Hand County, South Dakota
Politicians from New York City
United States Army soldiers